Naomi Novik (born April 30, 1973) is an American author of speculative fiction. She is known for the Temeraire series (2006–2016), an alternate history of the Napoleonic Wars involving dragons, and her Scholomance fantasy series (2020–2022). Her standalone fantasy novels Uprooted (2015) and Spinning Silver (2018) were inspired by Polish folklore and the Rumpelstiltskin fairy tale respectively. Novik has won many awards for her work, including the Alex, Audie, British Fantasy, Locus, Mythopoeic and Nebula Awards.

Early life
Novik grew up in Roslyn Heights on Long Island. She is a second-generation American; her father's family were Lithuanian Jews, and her mother's family were Polish Catholics. Displaying an interest in reading at a young age, she read The Lord of the Rings at age six, and developed a love for Jane Austen soon afterward.

She received a bachelor's degree in English literature at Brown University and holds a master's degree in computer science from Columbia University. She participated in the design and development of the computer game Neverwinter Nights: Shadows of Undrentide, until she discovered that she preferred writing over game design.

Career
Novik's first novel, His Majesty's Dragon (Temeraire in the UK) is the first novel in the Temeraire series, an alternate history of the Napoleonic Wars in a "Flintlock Fantasy" world where dragons are abundant and are used in aerial combat. His Majesty's Dragon won the Compton Crook Award in 2007 and was nominated for the Hugo Award for Best Novel. Temeraire: In the Service of the King is omnibus volume collecting the first three books of the series (His Majesty's Dragon, Throne of Jade, and Black Powder War); it won the Locus Award for Best First Novel in 2007.

In September 2006, Peter Jackson optioned the rights to the Temeraire series, intending to produce three or more live-action films, but the rights have since reverted to Novik. The Temeraire series has also been released in audiobook format. The first five audiobooks were released by Books on Tape, beginning in 2007, and read by Simon Vance. The sixth audiobook was released by Tantor Audio in September 2010, also read by Vance.

In September 2007, Novik was awarded the John W. Campbell Award for Best New Writer for best new science fiction writer of 2006. In 2011, Novik wrote Will Supervillains Be on the Final?, a graphic novel about the next generation of high-flying costumed crusaders. Yishan Li illustrated the comic with manga-styled art.

In 2015, Novik published Uprooted, a standalone novel "set in a fantasy world inspired by the Kingdom of Poland". It won the Nebula Award for Best Novel, the British Fantasy Award for Best Fantasy Novel, the Locus Award for Best Fantasy Novel, and the Mythopoeic Fantasy Award. Warner Bros. purchased the film rights to Uprooted; Ellen DeGeneres and Jeff Kleeman signed on to produce the film through their production company, A Very Good Production.

In 2016, Novik published "Spinning Silver", a short story retelling the Rumpelstiltskin fairy tale, in the fantasy anthology The Starlit Wood: New Fairy Tales. Two years later, she expanded the story into her second standalone novel, Spinning Silver, which won the 2019 Locus Award for Best Fantasy Novel, the 2019 Alex Award, and the 2019 Audie Award for Fantasy.

In 2020, Novik published A Deadly Education, the first in a trilogy set in the Scholomance, the retelling of folklore about a school of black magic. The main character, Galadriel "El" Higgins, a half-Welsh, half-Indian sorceress, must survive to graduation while controlling her destructive abilities. Universal Pictures purchased the film rights to the Scholomance series in advance, assigning Todd Lieberman and David Hoberman of Mandeville Films to develop and produce the films. Upon its release, A Deadly Education was criticized for a passage where the hairstyle known as dreadlocks is described as susceptible to an infestation of bug-like magical creatures. Novik later apologized for "evok[ing] a racist stereotype" about Afro-textured hair. She revised the passage for future reprints, and promised that the sequel novels will not be sent to reviewers and publishers before "revisions are fully complete and a final sensitivity read has happened."

Activism
Novik helped to organize the Organization for Transformative Works (OTW), a non-profit organization dedicated to the advancement of fan-media including fan fiction, fan videos (vids), and real-person fiction. In 2007 she was one of the three directors of the nonprofit.

Novik was a co-founder of Archive of Our Own (AO3), a project of OTW that began in 2007 to create an online archive of fan fiction. At the 2019 Hugo Award ceremony, AO3 won the award for Best Related Work; Novik accepted the prize on behalf of all AO3's creators and readers.

Personal life
Novik is married to entrepreneur and writer Charles Ardai. They live in Manhattan. They have one child, a daughter named Evidence Novik Ardai, who was born in 2010.

Awards and nominations
Novik has won the British Fantasy, Locus, Mythopoeic and Nebula Awards, and received nominations for the Hugo and World Fantasy Awards.

Publications

Standalone novels 
Uprooted (Del Rey, 2015) 
Spinning Silver (Del Rey / Macmillian, 2018)

Temeraire series

 His Majesty's Dragon (Del Rey, 2006) 
 Throne of Jade (Del Rey, 2006) 
 Black Powder War (Del Rey, 2006) 
 Empire of Ivory (Del Rey, 2007) 
 Victory of Eagles (Del Rey, 2008)  
 Tongues of Serpents (Del Rey, 2010)  
 Crucible of Gold (Del Rey, 2012)  
 Blood of Tyrants (Del Rey, 2013)  
 League of Dragons (Del Rey, 2016)

Omnibus editions
Temeraire: In the Service of the King (Science Fiction Book Club, 2006) 
In His Majesty's Service: Three Novels of Temeraire (Del Rey, 2009)

Scholomance trilogy
A Deadly Education (Del Rey, 2020) 
The Last Graduate (Del Rey, 2021) 
The Golden Enclaves (Del Rey, 2022)

Short stories in anthologies 

"Araminta, or, the Wreck of the Amphidrake" in Fast Ships, Black Sails (Night Shade Books, 2008) .
 "Commonplaces" in The Improbable Adventures of Sherlock Holmes (Night Shade Books, 2009) 
 "In Autumn, a White Dragon Looks Over the Wide River" in  In His Majesty's Service: Three Novels of Temeraire  (Del Rey, 2009)  
"Vici" in The Dragon Book: Magical Tales from the Masters of Modern Fantasy, edited by Jack Dann and Gardner Dozois (Ace Books, 2009) 
 "Purity Test" in Zombies vs. Unicorns, edited by Holly Black and Justine Larbalestier (Margaret K. McElderry Books, 2010) 
 "Seven Years from Home" in Warriors, edited by George R. R. Martin and Gardner Dozois (Tor Books, 2010) 
 "Priced to Sell" in Naked City: Tales of Urban Fantasy, edited by Ellen Datlow (St. Martin's Griffin, 2011) 
 "Lord Dunsany's Teapot" in The Thackery T. Lambshead Cabinet of Curiosities, edited by Ann & Jeff Vandermeer (Harper Voyager, 2011)  
 "Rocks Fall" in The Mad Scientist's Guide to World Domination, edited by John Joseph Adams (Tor Books, 2013) 
 "In Favour with Their Stars" in Unfettered, edited by Shawn Speakman (Grim Oak Press, 2013) 
 "Castle Coeurlieu" in Unfettered II, edited by Shawn Speakman (Grim Oak Press, 2016) 
"Spinning Silver" in The Starlit Wood: New Fairy Tales, edited by Dominik Parisien and Navah Wolfe (Saga Press, 2016) 
"Seven" in Unfettered III, edited by Shawn Speakman (Grim Oak Press, 2019)

Short stories
 "Feast or Famine" (Novik's official website)
 "Apples" (Novik's official website, 2005)
 Golden Age and Other Stories (Subterranean Press, 2017)

Notes

References

External links
Official website
Archive of Naomi Novik's LiveJournal page
Organization for Transformative Works

Interviews: SFFWorld (2006), Strange Horizons (2006), Ain't it Cool News (2007), Locus Online (2007), The Portalist (2016)

1973 births
21st-century American novelists
21st-century American women writers
American alternate history writers
American fantasy writers
American historical novelists
American women novelists
American people of Polish-Jewish descent
American people of Lithuanian-Jewish descent
Brown University alumni
Columbia Graduate School of Arts and Sciences alumni
Fan fiction writers
Jewish American novelists
John W. Campbell Award for Best New Writer winners
Living people
Nebula Award winners
Novelists from New York (state)
People from Roslyn Heights, New York
Women science fiction and fantasy writers
Women historical novelists